Charles Small may refer to:

Charles A. Small, lecturer at Yale University
Charles Coxwell Small, farmer and public official in Upper Canada
Charlie Small (1905–1953), baseball player
Charles John Small, former Canadian ambassador to Afghanistan

See also
Charlie Smalls (1943–1987), composer and songwriter